The 2014 NBA Summer League consists of two pro basketball leagues organized by the NBA and the Orlando Magic just after the 2014 NBA Draft. Ten teams took part in the week-long summer league at the Amway Center in Orlando, Florida, from July 5 to 11, 2014. The other summer league was the Las Vegas NBA Summer League, having taken place at the Thomas & Mack Center and Cox Pavilion in Paradise, Nevada (near Las Vegas) from July 11 to 21, 2014, with 23 NBA teams and the NBA D-League Select team participating. The Houston Rockets, Miami Heat and Philadelphia 76ers participated in both leagues.

The Philadelphia 76ers won the Orlando Pro Summer League Championship by defeating the Memphis Grizzlies in the title game, 91–75. Elfrid Payton was named the league's most valuable player.

The Sacramento Kings won the Las Vegas NBA Summer League Championship by defeating the Houston Rockets in the title game, 77–68. Glen Rice Jr. of the Washington Wizards was named the league's most valuable player. Ray McCallum of the Kings was named the most valuable player of the championship game.

Orlando Pro Summer League
Pursuant to a sponsorship agreement with Southwest Airlines Co., the official name of the league is the Southwest Orlando Pro Summer League in 2014. All games were played on the Orlando Magic's practice court in the Amway Center, not on the main basketball court at the venue. Tickets for the games were not sold to the general public.

Teams
Orlando Magic (host)
Boston Celtics
Brooklyn Nets
Detroit Pistons
Houston Rockets
Indiana Pacers
Memphis Grizzlies
Miami Heat
Oklahoma City Thunder
Philadelphia 76ers

Schedule
All times are in Eastern Daylight Time (UTC−4)

Day 1

Day 2

Day 3

Day 4

Day 5

Day 6

Championship day
Each team played one game on the league's final day for either first, third, fifth, seventh or ninth place.

Seeding criteria
The seeding was determined by a team's total points after the first five days. Eight points were awarded in each game: four points for winning a game and one point for every quarter a team won. In the event of a tied quarter, each team is awarded half a point. This differed from the previous year, when only three points were awarded for winning the game, and there were a maximum of seven total points available in each game. If two or more teams had equal points, then the following tiebreakers applied:
Total point differential
Least total points allowed
Coin flip
Each odd-numbered seed was paired with the team seeded immediately below it. For example, the top two seeds played in the championship game, the third and fourth seeds played in the third-place game, etc.

Standings/seedings

Championship day schedule
All times are in Eastern Daylight Time (UTC−4)

9th-place game

7th-place game

5th-place game

3rd-place game

Championship game

Final standings

Individual statistical leaders
Reference: 

Points

Rebounds

Assists

Honors
Josh Cohen of the Orlando Magic's website ranked the top five most valuable players in the Orlando Pro Summer League:
 Elfrid Payton, Orlando Magic
 Kentavious Caldwell-Pope, Detroit Pistons
 Nerlens Noel, Philadelphia 76ers
 James Ennis, Miami Heat
 Mason Plumlee, Brooklyn Nets

Las Vegas NBA Summer League
Pursuant to a sponsorship agreement with Samsung Group, the official name of the league is the Samsung NBA Summer League in 2014. Despite the fact that "Las Vegas" is not in the league's official name. and the games were actually played in Paradise, Nevada which is near but not in the City of Las Vegas, the league is nevertheless commonly referred to as the Las Vegas NBA Summer League or the Las Vegas Summer League. This is the case with links and references on the NBA's website.

Teams
Atlanta Hawks
Charlotte Hornets
Chicago Bulls
Cleveland Cavaliers
Dallas Mavericks
Denver Nuggets
Golden State Warriors
Houston Rockets
Los Angeles Clippers
Los Angeles Lakers
Miami Heat
Milwaukee Bucks
Minnesota Timberwolves
NBA D-League Select
New Orleans Pelicans
New York Knicks
Philadelphia 76ers
Phoenix Suns
Portland Trail Blazers
Sacramento Kings
San Antonio Spurs
Toronto Raptors
Utah Jazz
Washington Wizards

Schedule
All times are in Eastern Daylight Time (UTC−4)

Day 1

Day 2

Day 3

Day 4

Day 5

Championship
The championship was determined by a single-elimination tournament; the top 8 teams received a first-round bye.

Seeding criteria
Teams were seeded first by overall record, then by a tiebreaker system.
Head-to-head result (applicable only to ties between two teams, not to multiple-team ties)
Quarter point system (1 point for win, .5 for tie, 0 for loss, 0 for overtime periods)
Point differential
Coin flip

The head-to-head result was extremely unlikely to apply in determining seeding, since the teams played only three games before being seeded. It is impossible for two teams to both be 3-0 or 0-3 and have played one another. It is also very unlikely that exactly two teams and no others finish either 2-1 or 1-2 and for those two teams to have played one another. Even in the situation where there is a multiple-team tie and some but not all the teams have superior or inferior quarter points, the remaining teams look first to the point differential even if only two teams remain. Unlike tiebreak criteria often found in sports leagues, multiple-team ties that are reduced to two teams by progression through the tiebreaker steps are not returned to the first step of the two-team tiebreaker.

First-round losers played consolation games to determine 17th through 24th places. These teams either keep their own seeding or inherited that of their first-round opponent, if lower. For example, if the #9 seed lost in the first round to the #24 seed, it became the new #24 seed. Based on this, each odd-numbered reseeded team was matched against the next lower reseeded opponent with #17 playing #18, #19 playing #20, #21 playing #22 and #23 playing #24.

Second-round losers played consolation games to determine ninth through 16th places. These teams took the lower seed number of the two teams involved in their second-round games with the built-in assumption that lower-seeded teams that won their first-round games inherited the higher seed from the opponent they defeated. For example, if the #23 seed won its first-round game against the #10 seed, it was treated as the #10 seed in the second round. If the original #23 seed/inherited #10 seed then defeated the #7 seed in the second round, the #7 seed was treated as the #10 seed in the consolation round. Based on this, each odd-numbered reseeded team was matched against the next lower reseeded opponent with #9 playing #10, #11 playing #12, #13 playing #14, and #15 playing #16.

Standings/seedings

Bracket

 * indicates number of overtime periods.

Tournament schedule
All times are in Eastern Daylight Time (UTC−4)

First round

Second round

Consolation round

Quarterfinals

Semifinals

Championship game

Final standings

Individual statistical leaders
Reference: 

Points

Rebounds

Assists

Honors
The All-Summer League First and Second Teams were selected by a panel of media members in attendance at the Las Vegas NBA Summer League.

All-NBA Summer League First Team:
Doug McDermott, Chicago Bulls
Donatas Motiejūnas, Houston Rockets
Otto Porter, Washington Wizards
Glen Rice Jr., Washington Wizards (MVP)
Tony Snell, Chicago Bulls

All-NBA Summer League Second Team:
Rudy Gobert, Utah Jazz
Tim Hardaway Jr., New York Knicks
Jordan McRae, Philadelphia 76ers
Russ Smith, New Orleans Pelicans
T. J. Warren, Phoenix Suns

Championship Game MVP: Ray McCallum, Sacramento Kings

Notes

References

External links
Official site
Las Vegas Tournament Bracket

2014
2014–15 NBA season
2014–15 in American basketball by league
2014 in sports in Florida
2014 in sports in Nevada
July 2014 sports events in the United States